Events from the year 1694 in art.

Events
 A copy is made of the 14th century Siyar-i Nabi (Life of the Profet) of al-Zarir, Istanbul, Turkey. It is now kept at New York Public Library, New York Spencer Collection.

Paintings

 Louis Laguerre – Painted Room at Chatsworth House, England, completed
 Andrea Pozzo – Trompe-l'œil paintings on dome, apse and ceiling of Sant'Ignazio Church, Rome, completed

Births
 February 18 – Johann Christoph Handke, Moravian Baroque painter (died 1774)
 May 22 – Daniel Gran, Austrian painter of frescoes and altar paintings (died 1757)
 June 27 – John Michael Rysbrack, Flemish sculptor (died 1770)
 July 11 – Charles-Antoine Coypel, French painter, art commentator, and playwright (died 1752)
 September – Pietro Bianchi,  Italian painter of the Baroque period, active in Genoa and Rome (died 1740)
 September 9 – John Vanderbank, English portrait painter and book illustrator (died 1739)
 date unknown
 Jacques-Ignace de La Touche, French painter of miniatures and portraits (died 1781)
 Ottone Hamerani, Italian medallist (died 1761)
 Pierre-Jean Mariette, art collector (died 1774)
 Vincenzo Meucci, Italian painter with many patrons, including Anna Maria Luisa de' Medici (died 1766)
 Giuseppe Pedretti, Italian painter of lunettes and altarpieces (died 1770)

Deaths
 May 2 – Martin Desjardins, French sculptor and stuccoist of Dutch birth (born 1637)
 July – John Michael Wright, British baroque portrait painter (born 1617)
 July 25 – Hishikawa Moronobu, Japanese painter (born 1618)
 August 6 – Gabriel de la Corte, Spanish painter (born 1648)
 December 2 – Pierre Paul Puget, French artist (born 1620)
 December 12 – Filippo Lauri, Italian painter, became  the Principe or director of the Accademia di San Luca (born 1623)
 date unknown
 Thomas Heeremans, Dutch Golden Age painter (born 1641)
 Giacomo Lauri, Italian engraver of the Baroque period (born 1623)
 Crisóstomo Martinez, Valencian painter and engraver known for his anatomical atlas (born 1638)
 Giovanni Peruzzini, Italian painter of lunettes and religious themed works (born 1629)
 Antonio Sacchi, Italian painter (date of birth unknown)
 Ludovico Trasi, Italian painter of the Baroque period, born and active in Ascoli Piceno (born 1634)

 
Years of the 17th century in art
1690s in art